Balázs Kiss may refer to:
 Balázs Kiss (athlete), Hungarian hammer thrower
 Balázs Kiss (wrestler), Hungarian Greco-Roman wrestler
 Balázs Kiss (gymnast), Hungarian artistic gymnast